"I Fell in the Water" is a song written by Jerry Salley and Jeff Stevens, and recorded by American country music artist John Anderson.  It was released in August 1993 as the second single from his album Solid Ground.  The song reached number 13 on the Billboard Hot Country Singles & Tracks chart in November 1993.

Chart performance

References

1993 singles
1993 songs
John Anderson (musician) songs
BNA Records singles
Songs written by Jerry Salley
Songs written by Jeff Stevens (singer)
Song recordings produced by James Stroud
Music videos directed by Sherman Halsey